A lot of sequels and sometimes prequels to the old silver screen feature films have been released in many of the Indian languages. A film series is a collection of related films in succession. Their relationship is not fixed, but generally share a common diegetic world. The film series have been listed according to the date on which the first film of the series was released. Notes have been used to indicate relation to other films.

Only those film series with minimum 2 films, are listed.

Bengali / Tollywood

Story-line / Character followup 

The Apu Series (4 films)
 The Apu Trilogy
 Pather Panchali (1955)
 Aparajito (1956)
 The World of Apu (1959)
 Avijatrik (2021)
 Kanchenjungha film series (2 films)
 Kanchenjungha (1962)
 Abar Kanchanjangha (2022)
 Byomkesh Bakshi film series (20 films)
 With Uttam Kumar as Byomkesh Bakshi (1 film)
 Chiriyakhana (1967)
 With Satindra Bhattacharya as Byomkesh Bakshi (1 film)
 Shajarur Kanta (1974)
 With Subhrajit Dutta as Byomkesh Bakshi (1 film)
 Magno Mainak (2009)
 With Abir Chatterjee as Byomkesh Bakshi (9 films)
 Byomkesh Bakshi (2010)
 Abar Byomkesh (2012)
 Byomkesh Phire Elo (2014)
 Har Har Byomkesh (2015)
 Byomkesh Pawrbo (2016)
 Byomkesh Gotro (2018)
 Biday Byomkesh (2018)
 Byomkesh Hatyamancha (2022)
 With Sujoy Ghosh as Byomkesh Bakshi (1 film)
 Satyanweshi (2013)
 With Soumitra Chatterjee as Byomkesh Bakshi (1 film)
 Doorbeen (2014)
 With Dhritiman Chatterjee as Byomkesh Bakshi (1 film)
 Shajarur Kanta (2015)
 With Jisshu Sengupta as Byomkesh Bakshi (3 films)
 Byomkesh Bakshi (2015)
 Byomkesh O Chiriyakhana (2016)
 Byomkesh O Agnibaan (2017)
 With Parambrata Chatterjee as Byomkesh Bakshi (2 films)
 Satyanweshi Byomkesh (2019)
 Durgo Rahasya
 Goopy Gyne Bagha Byne trilogy  (3 films)
 Goopy Gyne Bagha Byne (1969)
 Hirak Rajar Deshe (1980)
 Goopy Bagha Phire Elo (1992)
 Aranye film series (2 films)
 Aranyer Din Ratri (1970)
 Abar Aranye (2003)
 Feluda film series (12 films)
 With Soumitra Chatterjee as Feluda (2 films)
 Sonar Kella (1974)
 Joi Baba Felunath (1979)
 With Sabyasachi Chakrabarty as Feluda (8 films)
 Baksho Rahashya (2001)
 Bombaiyer Bombete (2003)
 Kailashey Kelenkari (2007)
 Tintorettor Jishu (2008)
 Gorosthaney Sabdhan (2010)
 Royal Bengal Rohosso (2011)
 Doorbeen (2014)
 Double Feluda (2016)
 With Abir Chatterjee as Feluda (1 film)
 Badshahi Angti (2014)
 With Indraneil Sengupta as Feluda (1 film)
 Hatyapuri (2022)
 Kakababu film series (6 films)
 With Samit Bhanja as Kakababu (1 film)
 Sabuj Dwiper Raja (1979)
 With Sabyasachi Chakrabarty as Kakababu (2 films)
 Kakababu Here Gelen? (1995)
 Ek Tukro Chand (2001)
 With Prosenjit Chatterjee as Kakababu (3 films)
 Mishawr Rawhoshyo (2013)
 Yeti Obhijaan (2017)
 Kakababur Protyaborton (2022)
 Banchha film series (2 films)
 Banchharamer Bagan (1980)
 Banchha Elo Phire (2016)
 Anjan-Mamata film series (2 films)
 Kharij (1982)
 Palan (2023)
 Agantuk film series (2 films)
 Agantuk (1991)
 Agantuker Pore (2016)
 Fatakeshto film series (2 films)
 MLA Fatakeshto (2006)
 Minister Fatakeshto (2007)
 The Bongs film series (2 films)
 The Bong Connection (2006)
 The Bongs Again (2017)
 Cross Connection film series (2 films)
 Cross Connection (2009)
 Cross Connection 2 (2015)
 Baishe Srabon film series (2 films)
 Baishe Srabon (2011)
 Dwitiyo Purush (2020)
 Gogol film series (2 films)
 Goyenda Gogol (2013)
 Gogoler Kirti (2014)
 Boss film series (2 films)
 Boss: Born to Rule (2013)
 Boss 2: Back to Rule (2017)
 Chander Pahar film series (2 films)
 Chander Pahar (2013)
 Amazon Obhijaan (2017)
 Goenda Shabor film series (4 films)
 Ebar Shabor (2015)
 Eagoler Chokh (2016)
 Aschhe Abar Shabor (2018)
 Tirandaj Shabor (2022)
 Kiriti Roy film series (4 films)
 With Indraneil Sengupta as Kiriti Roy (2 films)
 Kiriti O Kalo Bhromor (2016)
 Nilacholey Kiriti (2018)
 With Chiranjeet Chakraborty as Kiriti Roy (1 film)
 Kiriti Roy (2016 film) (2016)
 With Priyanshu Chatterjee as Kiriti Roy (1 film)
 Ebong Kiriti (2017)
Detective Chandrakanta film series (2 films)
 Shororipu (2016)
 Shororipu 2: Jotugriho (2021)
Padma-Naseer film series (2 films)
 Bishorjan (2017)
 Bijoya (2019)
 Jawkher Dhan film series (2 films)
 Jawker Dhan (2017)
 Sagardwipey Jawker Dhan (2019)
 Sonada film series (3 films)
 Guptodhoner Sandhane (2018)
 Durgeshgorer Guptodhon (2019)
 Karnasubarner Guptodhon (2022)
 Bibaho Obhijaan film series (2 films)
 Bibaho Obhijaan (2019)
 Abar Bibaho Obhijaan (2023)
 Ekenbabu film series (2 films)
 The Eken (2022)
  The Eken: Ruddhaswas Rajasthan (2023)

Common diegetic world

 Calcutta trilogy by Satyajit Ray (3 films)
 Pratidwandi (1970)
 Seemabaddha (1971)
 Jana Aranya (1976)
 Calcutta trilogy by Mrinal Sen (3 films)
 Interview (1971)
 Calcutta 71 (1972)
 Padatik (1973)
 Bou film series (5 films)
 Choto Bou (1988)
 Mejo Bou (1995)
 Baro Bou (1997)
 Sundar Bou (1999)
 Sejo Bou (2003)
 Chirodini Tumi Je Amar film series (2 films)
 Chirodini Tumi Je Amar (2008)
 Chirodini Tumi Je Amar 2 (2014)
 Challenge film series (2 films)
 Challenge (2009)
 Challenge 2 (2012)
 Amanush film series (2 films)
 Amanush (2010)
 Amanush 2 (2015)
 Paglu film series (2 films)
 Paglu (2011)
 Paglu 2 (2012)
 Khoka film series (2 films)
 Khokababu (2012)
 Khoka 420 (2013)

Deccani

Story-line / Character followup 
 The Angrez film series (2 films)
 The Angrez (2005)
 The Angrez 2 (2015)
Hyderabad Nawabs film series (2 films)
 Hyderabad Nawabs (2006)
 Hyderabad Nawabs 2 (2019)
 Stepney film series (2 films)
 Stepney (2014)
 Stepney 2 Returns (2017)

Gujarati / Dhollywood

Story-line / Character followup 
 Maiyar Ma Manadu Nathi Lagtu series (2 films)
 Maiyar Ma Manadu Nathi Lagtu (2001)
 Maiyar Ma Manadu Nathi Lagtu Part II (2008)
 Chal Man Jeetva Jaiye (2 films)
 Chal Man Jeetva Jaiye (2017)
 Chal Man Jeetva Jaiye 2 (2023)

Common diegetic world 
 Gujjubhai series (2 films)
Gujjubhai the Great (2015)
 GujjuBhai - Most Wanted (2018)

Hindi / Bollywood

Story-line / Character followup 

 Hunterwali film series (2 films)
 Hunterwali (1935)
 Hunterwali Ki Beti (1943) 
 Jewel Thief film series (2 films)
 Jewel Thief (1967)
 Return of Jewel Thief (1996) 
 Arun film series (2 films)
 Ankhiyon Ke Jharokhon Se (1978)
 Jaana Pehchana (2011)
 Don film series (3 films)
 Don (1978)
 Don (2006)
 Don 2 (2011)
 Gunmaster G9 film series (2 films)
 Surakksha (1979)
 Wardat (1981) 
 Nagin film series (2 films)
 Nagina (1986)
 Nigahen: Nagina Part II (1989)
 Ghayal film series (2 films)
 Ghayal (1990)
 Ghayal: Once Again (2016)
Sadak film series (2 films)
 Sadak (1991)
 Sadak 2 (2020)
 Hyderabad Blues film series (2 films)
 Hyderabad Blues (1998)
 Hyderabad Blues 2 (2004)
 Gangster film series (4 films)
 Satya (1998)
 Company (2002)
 D (2005)
 Satya 2 (2013)
 Raghu film series (2 films)
 Vaastav (1999)
 Hathyar (2002)
 Hera Pheri Trilogy (2 films)
 Hera Pheri (2000)
 Phir Hera Pheri (2006)
 Hera Pheri 3 (2023)
 Style-Xcuse Me film series (2 films)
 Style (2001)
 Xcuse Me (2003)
Gadar film series (2 films)
 Gadar: Ek Prem Katha (2001)
 Gadar 2: The Katha Continues (2023)
 Krrish Trilogy (3 films)
 Koi... Mil Gaya (2003)
 Krrish (2006)
 Krrish 3 (2013)
 Dhoom Trilogy (3 films)
 Dhoom (2004)
 Dhoom 2 (2006)
 Dhoom 3 (2013)
Ab Tak Chhappan film series (2 films)
 Ab Tak Chhappan (2004)
 Ab Tak Chhappan 2 (2015)
 Sarkar Trilogy (3 films)
 Sarkar (2005)
 Sarkar Raj (2008)
 Sarkar 3 (2017)
Bunty Aur Babli film series (2 films)
 Bunty Aur Babli (2005)
 Bunty Aur Babli 2 (2021)
 Bheja Fry film series (2 films)
 Bheja Fry (2007)
 Bheja Fry 2 (2011)
 Welcome film series (2 films)
 Welcome (2007)
 Welcome Back (2015)
 Dhamaal Trilogy (3 films)
 Dhamaal (2007)
 Double Dhamaal (2011)
 Total Dhamaal (2019)
 Phoonk film series (2 films)
 Phoonk (2008)
 Phoonk 2 (2010)
 Jumbo film series (2 films)
 Jumbo (2008)
 Jumbo 2: The Return of the Big Elephant (2011)
Bhoothnath film series (2 films)
 Bhoothnath (2008)
 Bhoothnath Returns (2014)
Rock On!! film series (2 films)
 Rock On!! (2008)
 Rock On II (2016)
 Race Trilogy (3 films)
 Race (2008)
 Race 2 (2013)
 Race 3 (2018)
Love Aaj Kal film series (2 films)
 Love Aaj Kal (2009)
 Love Aaj Kal (2020)
 Rakta Charitra film series (2 films)
 Rakt Charitra: Part I (2010)
 Rakt Charitra: Part II (2010)
Once Upon A Time in Mumbaai film series (2 films)
 Once Upon A Time in Mumbaai (2010)
 Once Upon Ay Time in Mumbai Dobaara! (2013)
Ishqiya film series (2 films)
 Ishqiya (2010)
 Dedh Ishqiya (2014)
 Dunno Y... film series (2 films)
 Dunno Y... Na Jaane Kyon (2010)
 Dunno Y2... Life Is a Moment (2015)
 Dabangg Trilogy (3 films)
 Dabangg (2010)
 Dabangg 2 (2012)
 Dabangg 3 (2019)
Ragini MMS film series (2 films)
 Ragini MMS (2011)
 Ragini MMS 2 (2014)
Tanu Weds Manu film series (2 films)
 Tanu Weds Manu (2011)
 Tanu Weds Manu: Returns (2015)
 Force film series (2 films)
 Force (2011)
 Force 2 (2016)
 Saheb, Biwi Aur Gangster Trilogy (3 films)
 Saheb, Biwi Aur Gangster (2011)
 Saheb, Biwi Aur Gangster Returns (2013)
 Saheb, Biwi Aur Gangster 3 (2018)
 Cop Universe (5 films)
 Singham (2011)
 Singham Returns (2014)
 Simmba (2018)
 Sooryavanshi (2021)
 Singham Again (2023)
 Gangs of Wasseypur film series (2 films)
 Gangs of Wasseypur – Part 1 (2012)
 Gangs of Wasseypur – Part 2 (2012)
Student of the Year film series (2 films)
 Student of the Year (2012)
 Student of the Year 2 (2019)
Oh My God film series (2 films)
 OMG – Oh My God! (2012)
 OMG 2 – Oh My God! 2 (2023)
YRF Spy Universe (5 Films)
 Ek Tha Tiger (2012)
 Tiger Zinda Hai (2017)
 War (2019)
 Pathaan (2023)
 Tiger 3 (2023)
 Jolly LLB film series (2 films)
 Jolly LLB (2013)
 Jolly LLB 2 (2017)
 Commando Trilogy (3 films)
 Commando: A One Man Army (2013)
 Commando 2: The Black Money Trail (2017)
 Commando 3 (2019)
Fukrey film series (4 films)
 Fukrey (2013)
 Fukrey Returns (2017)
 Phone Bhoot (2022, spin-off)
 Fukrey 3 (2023)
Mardaani film series (2 films)
 Mardaani (2014)
 Mardaani 2 (2019)
Ek Villain film series (2 films)
 Ek Villain (2014)
 Ek Villain Returns (2022)
Baby film series (2 films)
 Baby (2015)
 Naam Shabana (2017)
Drishyam film series (2 films)
 Drishyam (2015)
 Drishyam 2 (2022)
Happy Bhag Jayegi film series (2 films)
 Happy Bhag Jayegi (2016)
 Happy Phirr Bhag Jayegi (2018)
Dinesh Vijan's horror-comedy universe (3 films)
 Stree (2018)
 Roohi (2021)
 Bhediya (2022)
Khuda Haafiz film series (2 films)
 Khuda Haafiz (2020)
 Khuda Haafiz: Chapter 2 – Agni Pariksha (2022)
Chhorii film series (2 films)
 Chhorii (2021)
 Chhorii 2 (2023)
Haseen Dillruba film series (2 films)
 Haseen Dillruba (2021)
 Phir Aayi Haseen Dillruba (2023)
Brahmāstra Trilogy (3 films)
 Brahmāstra: Part One – Shiva (2022)
 Brahmāstra: Part Two – Dev (2025)
 Brahmāstra: Part Three (2027)

Common diegetic world

 Love in Trilogy (3 films)
 Love in Simla (1960)
 Love in Tokyo (1966)
 Love in Bombay (2013)
Aashiqui Trilogy (3 films)
 Aashiqui (1990)
 Aashiqui 2 (2013)
 Aashiqui 3 (2023)
 Khiladi film series (8 films)
 Khiladi (1992)
 Main Khiladi Tu Anari (1994)
 Sabse Bada Khiladi (1995)
 Khiladiyon Ka Khiladi (1996)
 Mr. and Mrs. Khiladi (1997)
 International Khiladi (1999)
 Khiladi 420 (2000)
 Khiladi 786 (2012)
 No. 1 (film series) (8 films)
   Starring Govinda (6 films)
 Coolie No. 1 (1995)
 Hero No. 1 (1997)
 Aunty No. 1 (1998)
 Anari No. 1 (1999)
 Beti No. 1 (2000)
 Jodi No. 1 (2001)
 Directed by David Dhawan (6 films)
 Coolie No. 1 (1995)
 Hero No. 1 (1997)
 Biwi No.1 (1999)
 Jodi No. 1 (2001)
 Shaadi No. 1 (2005)
 Coolie No. 1 (2020)
 Produced by Vashu Bhagnani (6 films)
 Coolie No. 1 (1995)
 Hero No. 1 (1997)
 Anari No.1 (1999)
 Biwi No.1 (1999)
 Shaadi No. 1 (2005)
 Coolie No. 1 (2020)
 Sudhir Mishra Thriller film series (2 films)
 Is Raat Ki Subah Nahin (1996)
 Yeh Saali Zindagi (2011)
Judwaa film series (2 films)
 Judwaa (1997)
 Judwaa 2 (2017)
Satya film series (2 films)
 Satya (1998)
 Satya 2 (2013)
Tum Bin film series (2 films)
 Tum Bin (2001)
 Tum Bin II (2016)
Deewana Paagal film series (2 films)
 Awara Paagal Deewana (2002)
 Deewane Huye Paagal (2005) 
 Raaz Tetralogy (4 films)
 Raaz (2002)
 Raaz: The Mystery Continues (2009)
 Raaz 3D (2012)
 Raaz: Reboot (2016)
 Darna Mana/Zaroori Hai film series (2 films)
 Darna Mana Hai (2003)
 Darna Zaroori Hai (2006)
 Munna Bhai film series (2 films)
 Munna Bhai M.B.B.S (2003)
 Lage Raho Munna Bhai (2006)
 Bhoot film series (2 films)
 Bhoot (2003)
 Bhoot Returns (2012)
Jism film series (2 films)
 Jism (2003)
 Jism 2 (2012)
GangaaJal film series (2 films)
 Gangaajal (2003)
 Jai Gangaajal (2016)
Hungama film series (2 films)
 Hungama (2003)
 Hungama 2 (2021)
 Murder Trilogy (3 films)
 Murder (2004)
 Murder 2 (2011)
 Murder 3 (2013)
 Masti Trilogy (3 films)
 Masti (2004)
 Grand Masti (2013)
 Great Grand Masti (2016)
 Julie film series (2 films)
 Julie (2004)
 Julie 2 (2017)
 Kyaa Kool Hain Hum Trilogy (3 films)
 Kyaa Kool Hai Hum (2005)
 Kyaa Super Kool Hain Hum (2012)
 Kyaa Kool Hain Hum 3 (2016)
 Hanuman Trilogy (3 films)
 Hanuman (2005)
 Return of Hanuman (2007)
 Hanuman: Da' Damdaar (2017)
Malamaal film series (2 films)
 Malamaal Weekly (2006)
 Kamaal Dhamaal Malamaal (2012)
Side Effects film series (2 films)
 Pyaar Ke Side Effects (2006)
 Shaadi Ke Side Effects (2014)
Aksar film series (2 films)
 Aksar (2006)
 Aksar 2 (2017)
 Golmaal Pentalogy (5 films)
 Golmaal (2006)
 Golmaal Returns (2008)
 Golmaal 3 (2010)
 Golmaal Again!!!  (2017)
 Golmaal Five! (2024)
 My Friend Ganesha Tetralogy (4 films)
 My Friend Ganesha (2007)
 My Friend Ganesha 2 (2009)
 My Friend Ganesha 3 (2010)
 My Friend Ganesha 4 (2013)
Shootout Trilogy (3 films)
 Shootout at Lokhandwala (2007)
 Shootout at Wadala (2013)
 Shootout at Byculla (2024)
 Bal Ganesh Trilogy (3 films)
 Bal Ganesh (2007)
 Bal Ganesh 2 (2009)
 Bal Ganesh 3 (2015)
Surroor film series (2 films)
 Aap Kaa Surroor (2007)
 Teraa Surroor (2016)
Namastey film series (2 films)
 Namastey London (2007)
 Namaste England (2018)
Bhool Bhulaiyaa film series (2 films)
 Bhool Bhulaiyaa (2007)
 Bhool Bhulaiyaa 2 (2022)
Jannat film series (2 films)
 Jannat (2008)
 Jannat 2 (2012)
 1920 Pentalogy (5 films)
 1920 (2008)
 1920: Evil Returns (2012)
 1920: London (2016)
 1921 (2018)
 1920: Horrors of the Heart (2023)
Tere Bin Laden film series (2 films)
 Tere Bin Laden (2010)
 Tere Bin Laden: Dead or Alive (2016)
Atithi film series (2 films)
 Atithi Tum Kab Jaoge? (2010)
 Guest iin London (2017)
 Housefull Tetralogy (4 films)
 Housefull (2010)
 Housefull 2 (2012)
 Housefull 3 (2016)
 Housefull 4 (2019)
Love Sex Aur Dhokha film series (2 films)
 Love Sex Aur Dhokha (2010)
 Love Sex Aur Dhokha 2 (2023)
Pyaar Ka Punchnama film series (2 films)
 Pyaar Ka Punchnama (2011)
 Pyaar Ka Punchnama 2 (2015)
 Yamla Pagla Deewana Trilogy (3 films)
 Yamla Pagla Deewana (2011)
 Yamla Pagla Deewana 2 (2013)
 Yamla Pagla Deewana: Phir Se (2018)
 Hate Story Tetralogy (4 films)
 Hate Story (2012)
 Hate Story 2 (2014)
 Hate Story 3 (2015)
 Hate Story 4 (2018)
Student of the Year film series (2 films)
 Student of the Year (2012)
 Student of the Year 2 (2019)
Kahaani film series (3 films)
 Kahaani (2012)
 Kahaani 2: Durga Rani Singh (2016)
 Bob Biswas (2021)
B.A. Pass Trilogy (3 films)
 B.A. Pass (2013)
 B.A. Pass 2 (2017)
 B.A. Pass 3 (2021)
ABCD film series (2 films)
 ABCD: Any Body Can Dance (2013)
 ABCD 2 (2015)
Anthology Trilogy (3 films)
 Bombay Talkies (2013)
 Lust Stories (2018)
 Ghost Stories (2020)
Dulhania film series (2 films)
 Humpty Sharma Ki Dulhania (2014)
 Badrinath Ki Dulhania (2017)
Heropanti film series (2 films)
 Heropanti (2014)
 Heropanti 2 (2022)
The Xposé film series (2 films)
 The Xposé (2014)
 Badass RaviKumar (2023)
Yaariyan film series (2 films)
 Yaariyan (2014)
 Yaariyan 2 (2023)
MSG film series (4 films)
 The Messenger films (2 films)
 MSG: The Messenger (2015)
 MSG-2 The Messenger (2015)
 The Lion Heart films (2 films)
 MSG: The Warrior Lion Heart (2016)
 Hind Ka Napak Ko Jawab: MSG Lion Heart 2 (2017)
 Baaghi Trilogy (3 films)
 Baaghi (2016)
 Baaghi 2 (2018)
 Baaghi 3 (2020)
Medium film series (2 films)
 Hindi Medium (2017)
 Angrezi Medium (2020)
Shubh Mangal Saavdhan film series (2 films)
 Shubh Mangal Saavdhan (2017)
 Shubh Mangal Zyada Saavdhan (2020)
Satyameva Jayate film series (2 films)
 Satyameva Jayate (2018)
 Satyameva Jayate 2 (2021)
Badhaai film series (2 films)
 Badhaai Ho (2018)
 Badhaai Do (2022)
Dream Girl film series (2 films)
 Dream Girl (2019)
 Dream Girl 2 (2023)
Files Trilogy (3 films)
 The Tashkent Files (2019)
 The Kashmir Files (2022)
 The Delhi Files (2024)

Kannada / Sandalwood

Story-line / Character followup 

 James Bond Type series (4 Films)
Jedara Bale (1968)
Goa Dalli CID 999 (1968)
Operation Jackpot Nalli C.I.D 999 (1969)
Operation Diamond Racket (1978)
 Gandhada Gudi film series (2 Films)
Gandhada Gudi (1973)
Gandhada Gudi Part 2 (1994)
 Antha series (2 Films)
Antha (1981)
Operation Antha (1995)
 Sangliyana film series (3 Films) 
Sangliyana (1988)
S. P. Sangliyana Part 2 (1988)
Sangliyana Part 3 (1997)
 Upendra film series (2 films)
 Upendra (1999)
 Uppi 2 (2015)
 Nagavalli film series (2 films)
 Apthamitra (2004)
 Aptharakshaka (2010)
  Saar series (4 films)
 Kurigalu Saar Kurigalu (2001)
 Kothigalu Saar Kothigalu (2001)
 Katthegalu Saar Katthegalu (2002)
 Chatrigalu Saar Chatrigalu (2013)
 Deadly film series (2 films)
 Deadly Soma (2005)
 Deadly-2 (2010)
 Jogi film series (2 films)
 Jogi (2005)
 Jogayya (2011)
 Krishnan film series (2 films)
Krishnan Love Story (2010)
Krishnan Marriage Story (2011)
 Mungaru Male film series (2 films)
Mungaru Male (2006)
Mungaru Male 2 (2016)
 Drishya film series (2 films)
Drishya (2014)
Drishya 2  (2021)
 Huchcha film series (2 films)
Huchcha (2001)
Huccha 2 (2018)
 Rambo series (2 films)
 Rambo (2012)
 Rambo 2 (2018)
 K.G.F. film series (3 films)
K.G.F: Chapter 1 (2018)
K.G.F: Chapter 2 (2022)
K.G.F: Chapter 3 (2024)
 Kotigobba film series (3 Films)
Kotigobba (2001)
Kotigobba 2 (2016)
Kotigobba 3 (2020)

Common diegetic world 
 Police Story film series (3 films)
Police Story (1996)
Police Story 2 (2007)
Police Story 3 (2011)
 Savaari film series (2 films)
 Savaari (2009)
 Savaari 2 (2014)
 Kariya film series (2 films)
 Kariya (2003)
 Kariya 2 (2017)
 Kempegowda film series (2 films)
 Kempe Gowda (2011)
 Kempe Gowda 2 (2019)
 Dandupalya film series (4 films)
 Dandupalya (2012)
 Dandupalya 2 (2017)
 Dandupalya 3 (2018)
 Dandupalya 4 (2019)

Malayalam / Mollywood

Story-line / Character followup 

 Aana Valarthiya film series (2 films)
 Aana Valarthiya Vanampadi (1959)
 Aana Valarthiya Vanampadiyude Makan (1971)
 Othenan film series (3 films)
 Thacholi Othenan (1964)
 Othenante Makan (1970)
 Kadathanadan Ambadi (1990)
 Kattuthulasi film series (2 films)
 Kattuthulasi (1965)
 Thenaruvi (1973)
 Chemmeen film series (3 films)
 Chemmeen (1965)
 Thirakalkkappuram (1998)
 Kayamkulam Kochunni film series (2 films)
 Kayamkulam Kochunni (1966)
 Kayamkulam Kochunniyude Makan (1976)
 Ashwamedham film series (2 films)
 Ashwamedham (1967)
 Sarasayya (1971)
 Chellamma film series (2 films)
 Kallichellamma (1969)
 Arikkari Ammu (1981)
 C.I.D. Nazir film series (3 films)
 C.I.D. Nazir (1971)
 Taxi Car (1972)
 Preathangalude Thazhvaram (1973)
 Lisa film series (2 films)
 Lisa (1978)
 Veendum Lisa (1987)
 Tharadas & Balram film series (4 films)
 Athirathram (1984)
 Aavanazhi (1986)
 Inspector Balram (1991)
 Balram vs. Tharadas (2006)
 Ninnishtam Ennishtam film series (2 films)
 Ninnishtam Ennishtam (1986)
 Ninnishtam Ennishtam 2 (2011)
 Dasan and Vijayan film series (3 films)
 Nadodikkattu (1987)
 Pattanapravesham (1988)
 Akkare Akkare Akkare (1990)
 Sagar Alias Jacky film series (2 films)
 Irupatham Noottandu (1987)
 Sagar Alias Jacky Reloaded (2009)
 CBI film series (5 films)
 Oru CBI Diary Kurippu (1988)
 Jagratha (1989)
 Sethurama Iyer CBI (2004)
 Nerariyan CBI (2005)
 CBI 5: The Brain (2022)
 August 1-film series (2 films)
 August 1? (1988)
 August 15 (2011)
 Kireedam film series (2 films)
 Kireedam (1989)
 Chenkol (1993)
 Ramji Rao Speaking film series (3 films)
 Ramji Rao Speaking (1989)
 Mannar Mathai Speaking (1995)
 Mannar Mathai Speaking 2 (2014)
 Harihar Nagar film series (3 films)
 In Harihar Nagar (1990)
 2 Harihar Nagar (2009)
 In Ghost House Inn (2010)
Samrajyam film series (3 films)
 Samrajyam (1990)
 Samrajyam II: Son of Alexander (2015)
 Kilukkam film series (2 films)
 Kilukkam (1991)
 Kilukkam Kilukilukkam (2006)
 Khader Bhai film series (3 films)
 Mimics Parade (1991)
 Kasargod Khader Bhai (1992)
 Again Kasargod Khader Bhai (2010)
 Devasuram film series (2 films)
 Devasuram (1993)
 Raavanaprabhu (2001)
  Dr. Sunny Joseph film series (2 films)
 Manichitrathazhu (1993)
 Geethaanjali (2013)
 Uppukandam film series (2 films)
 Uppukandam Brothers (1993)
 Uppukandam Brothers Back in Action (2011)
Akashadoothu film-TV series (1 film, 1 series)
 Akashadoothu (1993)
 Akashadoothu (TV series) (2011)
Mikhayel sons TV-film series (1 serial, 1 film)
 Mikhayelinte Santhathikal [TV serial] (1993) 
 Puthran (1994)
 Commissioner and The King film series (4 films)
 Commissioner (1994)
 The King (1995)
 Bharathchandran I.P.S. (2005)
 The King & the Commissioner (2012)
Azhagiya Ravanan-Ambujakshan film series (2 films)
 Azhakiya Ravanan (1996)
 Chirakodinja Kinavukal (2015)
 Mandrake film series (2 films)
 Junior Mandrake (1997)
 Senior Mandrake (2010)
 Kannur film series (2 films)
 Kannur (1997)
 Veendum Kannur (2012)
 Aakasha Ganga film series (2 films)
 Aakasha Ganga (1999)
 Aakasha Ganga 2 (2019)
 Saathan and Don film series (2 films)
 Stop Violence (2002)
 Asuravithu (2012)
 The People film series (3 films)
 4 the People (2004)
 By the People (2005)
 Of the People (2008)
 Udayananu Tharam film series (2 films)
 Udayananu Tharam (2005)
 Padmasree Bharat Dr. Saroj Kumar (2012)
 Lisamma film series (2 films)
 Achanurangatha Veedu (2006)
 Lisammayude Veedu (2013) 
 Major Mahadevan film series (4 films)
 Keerthi Chakra (2006)
 Kurukshetra (2008)
 Kandahar (2010)
 1971 Beyond Borders (2017)
 Pokkiri Raja film series (3 films)
 Pokkiri Raja (2010)
 Madhura Raja (2019)
 Minister Raja (2023)
  Salt N' Pepper film series (2 films)
 Salt N' Pepper (2011)
 Black Coffee (2021)
 Honey Bee film series (3 films)
 Honey Bee (2013)
 Honey Bee 2 (2017)
 Honey Bee 2.5 (2017)
  Punyalan film series (2 films)
 Punyalan Agarbattis (2013)
 Punyalan Private Limited (2017)
 Drishyam film series (3 films)
 Drishyam (2013)
 Drishyam 2 (2021)
 Drishyam 3 (2024)
  Aadu film series (3 films)
 Aadu (2015)
 Aadu 2 (2017)
 Aadu 3 (2023)
  Pretham film series (2 films)
 Pretham (2016)
 Pretham 2 (2018)

Common diegetic world
 Mimics film series (2 films)
 Mimics Action 500 (1995)
 Mimics Super 1000 (1996)
 Bharya film series (2 films)
 Veruthe Oru Bharya (2008)
 Bharya Athra Pora (2013)
 Husbands film series (2 films)
 Happy Husbands (2010)
 Husbands in Goa (2012)
 Chocolate film series (2 films)
 Chocolate (2007)
 Chocolate Story Retold (2022)

Marathi / Mollywood

Story-line / Character followup 

 Zapatlela film series (2 films)
 Zapatlela (1993)
 Zapatlela 2 (2013)
Aga Bai Arrecha film series (2 films)
 Aga Bai Arrecha! (2004)
 Aga Bai Arechyaa 2 (2015)
De Dhakka film series (2 films)
 De Dhakka (2008)
 De Dhakka 2 (2022)
 Gallit Gondhal Dillit Milujra  (2 films)
 Gallit Gondhal, Dillit Mujra (2009)
 Punha Gondhal Punha Mujra (2014)
 Mumbai-Pune-Mumbai film series (3 films)
 Mumbai-Pune-Mumbai (2010)
 Mumbai-Pune-Mumbai 2 (2015)
 Mumbai Pune Mumbai 3 (2018)
Agadbam film series (2 films)
 Agadbam (2010)
 Maza Agadbam (2018)
 Chintoo film series (2 films)
 Chintoo (2012)
 Chintoo 2 (2013)
 Timepass film series (3 films)
 Timepass (2014)
 Timepass 2 (2015)
 Timepass 3 (2022)
Dagadi Chawl film series (2 films)
 Dagadi Chawl (2015)
 Dagadi Chawl 2 (2022)
Boyz film series (3 films)
 Boyz (2017)
 Boyz 2 (2018)
 Boyz 3 (2022)
Ye Re Ye Re Paisa film series (2 films)
 Ye Re Ye Re Paisa (2018)
 Ye Re Ye Re Paisa 2 (2019)
Bhai film series (2 films)
 Bhai: Vyakti Ki Valli (2019)
 Bhai: Vyakti Ki Valli 2 (2019)
Shri Shivraj Ashtak (5 films)
 Farzand (2018)
 Fatteshikast (2019)
 Pawankhind (2022)
 Sher Shivraj (2022)
 Subhedar (2023) 
Takatak film series (2 films)
 Takatak (2019)
 Takatak 2 (2022)

Odia/ Ollywood

Story-line / Character followup 
 Something Something film series (2 films)
 Something Something (2011)
 Something Something 2 (2014)

Punjabi / Pollywood

Story-line / Character followup 

 Yaraan Naal Baharaan film series (2 films)
 Yaraan Naal Baharaan (2005)
 Yaraan Naal Baharaan II (2012)
 Jatt & Juliet film series (2 films)
 Jatt & Juliet (2012)
 Jatt & Juliet 2 (2013)
 Carry On Jatta Trilogy (3 films)
 Carry On Jatta (2012)
 Carry On Jatta 2 (2018)
 Carry On Jatta 3 (2021)
 Daddy Cool Munde Fool film series (2 films)
 Daddy Cool Munde Fool (2013)
 Daddy Cool Munde Fool 2 (2020)
 Chaar Sahibzaade film series (2 films)
 Chaar Sahibzaade (2014)
 Chaar Sahibzaade: Rise of Banda Singh Bahadur (2016)
 Nikka Zaildar Trilogy (3 films)
 Nikka Zaildar (2016)
 Nikka Zaildar 2 (2017)
 Nikka Zaildar 3 (2019)
 Manje Bistre Trilogy (3 films)
 Manje Bistre (2017)
 Manje Bistre 2 (2019)
 Manje Bistre 3 (2021)
 Rabb Da Radio film series (2 films)
 Rabb Da Radio (2017)
 Rabb Da Radio 2 (2019)
 Chal Mera Putt Trilogy (3 films) 
 Chal Mera Putt (2019)
 Chal Mera Putt 2 (2020)
 Chal Mera Putt 3 (2021)
 Laung Laachi film series (2 films)
 Laung Laachi (2018)
 Laung Laachi 2 (2022)

 Common diegetic world  Sardaar Ji film series (2 films)
 Sardaar Ji (2015)
 Sardaar Ji 2 (2016)

 Tamil / Kollywood 

 Story-line / Character followup  Kalyanaraman film series (2 films)
 Kalyanaraman (1979)
 Japanil Kalyanaraman (1985) Manal Kayiru film series (2 films)
 Manal Kayiru (1982)
 Manal Kayiru 2 (2016) Salem Vishnu film series (2 films)
 New Delhi (1987)
 Salem Vishnu (1990) Krodham film series (2 films)
 Krodham (1989)
 Krodham 2 (2000) Indian film series (2 films)
 Indian (1996)
 Indian 2 (2023) Saamy film series (2 films)
 Saamy (2003)
 Saamy Square (2018) Sandakozhi film series (2 films)
 Sandakozhi (2005)
 Sandakozhi 2 (2018) Billa film series (2 films)
 Billa (2007)
 Billa II (2012) Chennai 600028 film series (2 films)
 Chennai 600028 (2007)
 Chennai 600028 II: Second Innings (2016)Vennila Kabadi Kuzhu film series (2 films)
 Vennila Kabadi Kuzhu (2009)
 Vennila Kabaddi Kuzhu 2 (2019) Singam film series (3 films)
 Singam (2010)
 Singam II (2013)
 Si3 (2017)Enthiran film series (2 films)
 Enthiran (2010)
 2.0 (2018)Thamizh Padam film series (2 films)
Thamizh Padam (2010)
Thamizh Padam 2 (2018) Kalavani film series (2 films)
 Kalavani (2010)
 Kalavani 2 (2019) Vishwaroopam film series (2 films)
 Vishwaroopam (2013)
 Vishwaroopam II (2018)Chennaiyil Oru Naal film series (2 films)
 Chennaiyil Oru Naal (2013)
 Chennaiyil Oru Naal 2 (2017) Maari film series (2 films)
 Maari (2015)
 Maari 2 (2018) Velaiilla Pattadhari film series (2 films)
 Velaiilla Pattadhari (2014)
 Velaiilla Pattadhari 2 (2017)Baahubali (2 films)
 Baahubali: The Beginning (2015)
 Baahubali 2: The Conclusion (2017)Devi film series (2 films)
 Devi (2016)
 Devi 2 (2019)Thupparivaalan film series (2 films)
Thupparivaalan (2017)
Thupparivaalan 2 (2022)Lokesh Cinematic Universe (3 films)
 Kaithi (2019)
 Vikram (2022)
 Kaithi 2 (2024)Ponniyin Selvan film series (2 films)
 Ponniyin Selvan: I (2022)
 Ponniyin Selvan: II (2024)

 Common diegetic world  Neeya film series (2 films)
 Neeya? (1979)
 Naane Varuven (1992)
 Neeya 2 (2019) Azhiyatha Kolangal film series (2 films)
 Azhiyatha Kolangal (1979)
 Azhiyatha Kolangal 2 (2019) Manithan film series (2 films)
 Nalaya Manithan (1989)
 Adhisaya Manithan (1990) Pulan Visaranai film series (2 films)
 Pulan Visaranai (1990)
 Pulan Visaranai 2 (2015) Jai Hind film series (2 films)
 Jai Hind (1994)
 Jai Hind 2 (2014) Jithan film series (2 films)
 Jithan (2005)
 Jithan 2 (2016) Thiruttu Payale film series (2 films)
 Thiruttu Payale (2006)
 Thiruttu Payale 2 (2017) Naan Avanillai film series (2 films)
 Naan Avanillai (2007)
 Naan Avanillai 2 (2009) Muni film series  (5 films)
 Muni (2007)
 Muni 2: Kanchana (2011)
 Kanchana 2 (2015)
 Kanchana 3 (2019)
 Kanchana 4 (2022) Pasanga film series (2 films)
 Pasanga (2009)
 Pasanga 2: Haiku (2015) Ko film series  (2 films)
 Ko (2011)
 Ko 2 (2016) Kalakalappu film series  (2 films)
 Kalakalappu (2012)
 Kalakalappu 2 (2018)Saattai franchise (3 films)
 Saattai (2012)
Appa (2016)
 Adutha Saattai (2019) Pizza film series (2 films)
 Pizza (2012)
 Pizza 2: The Villa (2013)Aranmanai film series (3 films)
 Aranmanai (2014)
 Aranmanai 2 (2016)
 Aranmanai 3 (2021) Darling film series (2 films)
 Darling (2015)
 Darling 2 (2016)Charlie Chaplin film series (2 films)
Charlie Chaplin (2002)
Charlie Chaplin 2 (2019)Goli Soda film series (2 films)
Goli Soda (2015)
Goli Soda 2 (2018)Dhilluku Dhuddu film series (2 films)
Dhilluku Dhuddu (2016)
Dhilluku Dhuddu 2 (2019)Uriyadi film series (2 films)
Uriyadi (2016)
Uriyadi 2 (2019)

 Telugu / Tollywood 

 Story-line / Character followup  Gaayam film series (2 films)
 Gaayam (1993)
 Gaayam 2 (2010) Money film series (3 films)
 Money (1993)
 Money Money (1995)
 Money Money, More Money (2011) Pelli Sandadi film series (2 films)
 Pelli Sandadi (1996)
 Pelli SandaD (2021)
 Manmadhudu film series (2 films)
 Manmadhudu (2002)
 Manmadhudu 2 (2019) Arya film series (2 films)
 Arya (2004)
 Arya 2 (2009) Shankar Dada film series (2 films)
 Shankar Dada M.B.B.S. (2004)
 Shankar Dada Zindabad (2007)Chandramukhi film series (2 films)
 Chandramukhi (2005)
 Nagavalli (2010) Kick film series (2 films)
 Kick (2009)
 Kick 2 (2015)Raktha Charitra film series (2 films)
  Rakta Charitra I (2010)
  Rakta Charitra II (2010) Gabbar Singh film series (2 films)
 Gabbar Singh (2012)
 Sardaar Gabbar Singh (2016)Avunu film series (2 films)
 Avunu (2012)
 Avunu 2 (2015)Drushyam film series (2 films)
 Drushyam (2014)
 Drushyam 2 (2021)VIP film series (2 films)
 Raghuvaran B. Tech (2014)
 VIP 2 (2017)Baahubali film series (2 films)
 Baahubali: The Beginning (2015)
 Baahubali 2: The Conclusion (2017) Raju Gari Gadhi (3 films)
 Raju Gari Gadhi (2015)
 Raju Gari Gadhi 2 (2017)
 Raju Gari Gadhi 3 (2019)
 Banagarraju film series (2 films)
 Soggade Chinni Nayana (2016)
 Bangarraju (2022)Abhinetri film series (2 films)
 Abhinetri (2016)
 Abhinetri 2 (2019)NTR film series (2 films)
 N.T.R: Kathanayakudu (2019)
 N.T.R: Mahanayakudu (2019)Fun and Frustration (2 films)
 F2: Fun and Frustration (2019)
 F3 (2022) Pushpa (2 films)
 Pushpa: The Rise – Part 1 (2021)
 Pushpa: The Rule – Part 2 (2023)

 Common Diegetic World  Jai Hind film series Jai Hind (1994)
 Jai Hind 2 (2014)
 Satya film series (2 films)
 Satya (1998)
 Satya 2 (2013)Aithe series Aithe (2003)
 Aithe 2.0 (2018) Aravind film series (2 films)
 A Film by Aravind (2005)
 Aravind 2 (2013) Vennela film series (2 films)
 Vennela (2005)
 Vennela 1 1/2 (2012)Operation Duryodhana film series (2 films)
 Operation Duryodhana (2007)
 Operation Duryodhana 2 (2013)Vinayakudu film series (2 films)
 Vinayakudu (2008)
 Villagelo Vinayakudu (2009)Prema Katha Chitram film series (2 films)
Prema Katha Chitram (2013)
Prema Katha Chitram 2  (2019) Ice Cream film series (2 films)
 Ice Cream (2014)
 Ice Cream 2 (2014)The HIT Verse' (2 films)HIT: The First Case (2020)HIT: The Second Case'' (2022)

Notes

References 

India

series